The 12th Secretariat of the Communist Party of Vietnam (CPV), formally the 12th Secretariat of the Central Committee of the Communist Party of Vietnam (Vietnamese: Ban Bí thư Ban Chấp hành Trung ương Đảng Cộng sản Việt Nam Khoá XII), was partly elected by a decision of the 12th Politburo and partly elected by the 1st Plenary Session of the 12th Central Committee (CC) in the immediate aftermath of the 12th National Congress. 

On 4 February 2016, Nguyễn Phú Trọng, as General Secretary of the Central Committee, signed the decision of the 12th Politburo that elected six of its members to serve in the 12th Secretariat. The 6th CC Plenary Session on 6 October 2017 and the 7th CC Plenary Session on 9 May 2018 elected two new members to the Secretariat each.

Members

References

Bibliography

12th Secretariat of the Communist Party of Vietnam